PrimoHoagies Franchising, Inc. , doing business as PrimoHoagies (stylized as PrimoHoagies), is a United States east coast-based, fast casual restaurant chain founded in 1992 in South Philadelphia. Primo Hoagies has over 95 locations in seven states, Pennsylvania, Delaware, New Jersey, Maryland, South Carolina, Florida and Virginia.

History
Primo Hoagies was founded on Ritner Street in South Philadelphia in July 1992 by Richard and Colleen Neigre.  In 2002, the restaurant was franchised with its corporate headquarters located in Westville, New Jersey. Eric Bonner is the Chief Operation Officer and has served in several positions with the company over the last 19 years. The most popular sandwiches are the "Italian with prosciutto [and] provolone cheese, Hot Capicola and natural casing Genoa salami".

The franchise is known for its Philadelphia styled hoagies. Lindsey Nolen of South Philly Review stated "Primos is Primo when it comes to an Italian Hoagie". Primo opened in a store in Citizens Bank Park in 2017.

At the 2016 Philadelphia Cheesesteak & Food Festival, Primo Hoagies brought its specialty Italian hoagies to the festival.

Richard Neigre died on May 5, 2022, at his home in Sewell, N.J.

See also
 List of submarine sandwich restaurants

References

External links 
 

Submarine sandwich restaurants
Regional restaurant chains in the United States
Companies based in New Jersey
Fast-food chains of the United States
Restaurants established in 1992
American companies established in 2002
Restaurants in Philadelphia
1992 establishments in Pennsylvania
South Philadelphia